Desidustat (INN, also known as ZYAN1) is a drug for the treatment of anemia of chronic kidney disease. This drug with the brand name Oxemia is discovered and developed by Zydus Life Sciences. Desidustat reduces the requirement of recombinant erythropoietin requirement in anemia, and decreases EPO-resistance, by reducing IL-6, IL-1β, and anti-EPO antibodies. The subject expert committee of CDSCO has recommended the grant of permission for manufacturing and marketing of Desidustat 25 mg and 50 mg tablets in India,based on some conditions related to package insert, phase 4 protocols, prescription details, and GCP. Clinical trials on desidustat have been done in India and Australia.  In a Phase 2, randomized, double-blind, 6-week, placebo-controlled, dose-ranging, safety and efficacy study, a mean hemoglobin increase of 1.57, 2.22, and 2.92 g/dL in desidustat 100, 150, and 200 mg arms, respectively, was observed. The Phase 3 clinical trials were conducted in chronic kidney disease patients which were not on dialysis  as well as on dialysis. Desidustat is developed for the treatment of anemia as an oral tablet, where currently injections of erythropoietin and its analogues are drugs of choice. Desidustat is a HIF prolyl-hydroxylase inhibitor. In preclinical studies, effects of desidustat was assessed in normal and nephrectomized rats, and in chemotherapy-induced anemia. Desidustat demonstrated hematinic potential by combined effects on endogenous erythropoietin release and efficient iron utilization. Desidustat can also be useful in treatment of anemia of inflammation since it causes efficient erythropoiesis and hepcidin downregulation. In January 2020, Zydus entered into licensing agreement with China Medical System (CMS) Holdings for development and commercialization of desidustat in Greater China. Under the license agreement, CMS will pay Zydus an initial upfront payment, regulatory milestones, sales milestones and royalties on net sales of the product. CMS will be responsible for development, registration and commercialization of desidustat in Greater China. It has been observed that desidustat protects against acute and chronic kidney injury by reducing inflammatory cytokines like IL-6 and oxidative stress  A clinical trial to evaluate the efficacy and safety of desidustat tablet for the management of Covid-19 patients is ongoing in Mexico, wherein desidustat has shown to prevent acute respiratory distress syndrome (ARDS) by inhibiting IL-6.  Zydus has also received approval from the US FDA to initiate clinical trials of desidustat in chemotherapy Induced anemia (CIA).

References 

Experimental drugs
4-Quinolones
Cyclopropanes
Vinylogous carboxylic acids